Jaime Reyes is a superhero appearing in American comic books published by DC Comics. Created by Keith Giffen, John Rogers, and Cully Hamner, the character made his first appearance in Infinite Crisis #3 (February 2006).

Jaime Reyes is the third character to assume the mantle of Blue Beetle, but is substantially different from his predecessors. Introduced in 1939, the original Blue Beetle, Dan Garret, was a Fox Comics police officer who fought crime with superpowers gained by ingesting Vitamin 2X. A revamped version of this character, archaeologist Dan Garrett, introduced in 1964 by Charlton Comics drew mystical abilities from an ancient Egyptian scarab. Published by Charlton Comics and later DC, 1966 creation Ted Kord was Garret's student who continued his legacy of costumed crime-fighting, although he had no superpowers.

DC's introduction of Jaime Reyes in 2006 retconned and expanded upon the Blue Beetle mythos. Revealed to be alien in origin, the scarab bonds with Reyes and provides him with a suit of extraterrestrial armor shortly after Kord's death. Though only a teenager, Reyes quickly forms a working relationship with Kord's former teammate and best friend Booster Gold and is inducted into the Teen Titans and the Justice League.

Xolo Maridueña will portray the character in his own live-action film set in the DC Extended Universe.

Publication history
In Infinite Crisis #5 (March 2006), Reyes became Blue Beetle's third incarnation. His own monthly series debuted two months later with Blue Beetle vol. 7 #1 (May 2006); it was initially written by Keith Giffen and John Rogers, with artist Cully Hamner. Giffen left before issue #10 and Rogers took over full writing duties, joined by new artist Rafael Albuquerque. Rogers left in issue #25 to concentrate on his television series Leverage.

After a couple of fill-in issues, Lilah Sturges became the main writer in issue #29 but the series was canceled with last issue #36 in February 2009. Editor Dan DiDio put the cancellation down to poor sales and said that Blue Beetle was "a book that we started with very high expectations, but it lost its audience along the way".

The character returned in June 2009 as a "co-feature" of the more popular Booster Gold comic.

Fictional character biography

Jaime lives in El Paso, Texas, US with his father, mother and little sister; his father owns a garage. Jaime offers to help his father at the garage, but his father feels Jaime should study and enjoy his childhood for as long as he can. Jaime has an acute sense of responsibility for his family and friends, though he complains about having to sort out their various problems. He derives strength and courage from his family's support, wanting what's best for them.

Infinite Crisis

The mystical Scarab that had given Dan Garrett his powers had been thought destroyed. When it was found intact, it was given to Ted Kord, who was never able to use it. After an attack by Brother Eye, the Scarab appeared energized and Ted brought it to the wizard Shazam, who took it and sent Ted away. Shortly after, in the Day of Vengeance storyline, Shazam was killed and the Scarab was blasted across the globe along with shards from The Rock of Eternity.

The Scarab came to Earth in El Paso, Texas, where Jaime picked it up. Not long after, Booster Gold appeared at Jaime's house to retrieve it, but it had fused itself to Jaime's spine while he was sleeping. Booster recruited Jaime for Batman's assault on the Brother Eye satellite, since the Scarab was the only thing that could see the satellite. Using the Scarab's powers, Jaime was able to reveal the satellite to Batman's group, and enabled them to defeat it. Once Brother Eye was sent plummeting Earthward, Jaime disappeared from the ship, teleported away by the scarab, which sought to escape the Green Lanterns on board.

Ongoing series
Jaime was next seen in his own monthly series, fighting off Green Lantern Guy Gardner, who had been driven to rage by his ring's reaction to the scarab. A flashback expanded on Jaime's discovery of the scarab, revealing how the scarab bonded itself to Jaime and showing his first encounter with a metahuman. After the fight, Jaime found himself alone and naked in the desert and had to hitch-hike home. Upon his return, Jaime discovered he had been missing for a whole year because the scarab used a dimensional mode of transport to get back to Earth. Unlike most superheroes, Jaime shared his identity with family and friends.

He began a career as a superhero, meeting Oracle, the Phantom Stranger and the current Peacemaker during his early adventures and ends up in conflict with supervillains like the ones that work for the crime boss La Dama. He often associates himself with a street gang of local superhumans known as the Posse. His support team agreed to help Jaime track crime and natural disasters in the Midwest via the Internet.

Contrary to Jaime's initial belief, the scarab is revealed to be extraterrestrial technology. However, magical influences involving the first contact with Earthmen left the scarab "corrupted" and uncontrollable by the Reach of Space Sector 2. Gardner returns and reveals how the Reach and the Green Lantern Corps had battled in the past, forcing the Reach into a truce. The Reach continued pursuing their invasion plans, offering the scarab as a "protector" and then forcibly turning his host into their vanguard. The scarab's fully functional A.I. acts as an agent for the Reach. As Jaime's scarab has only a partly functioning A.I., falling more and more into his control and forming an alliance with him, the Reach changed their agenda into feigning friendship with Jaime and the Earth, attacking him in a more subversive manner.

The Reach
The Reach are ancient enemies of the Guardians of the Universe, though their pact with the Guardians forbids them from invading new cultures, including Earth. Jaime has recently sought help from S.T.A.R. Labs to discover the scarab's full power. The Reach appear to be enemies of the Controllers; Jaime's scarab suit reacts violently to a Darkstars uniform worn by the current Manhunter Kate Spencer.

In a Countdown to Final Crisis tie-in, Jaime assists Traci Thirteen (former) in foiling Eclipso's attempt to kidnap a baby with great magical potential and use it as a new, uncorrupted host. In the aftermath, Jaime and Traci kiss, hinting at a relationship starting.

Jaime takes the fight to the Reach, using the time-warping qualities of the Bleed to attack three of their machines at once. When this fails, Jaime attacks the Reach's flagship, but the Reach use their weapons to attack his home. Jaime's emotional outburst at this attack allows the Reach to shut down the scarab and remove it from Jaime, who is thrown into a holding cell while the scarab is taken for examination, but the scarab transfers its knowledge into Jaime before removal, allowing the young hero to break free. Meanwhile, Jaime's family, having escaped the attack, are protected from further Reach assault by Peacemaker, the Posse, Traci Thirteen, La Dama and later Guy Gardner, Fire and Ice. Attacking several guards and taking their armor, Jaime heads for the engine, forcing the Reach to shut it down which reveals their ship. Once captured and brought to the bridge, Jaime shouts "Khaji Da!". He then reveals that, during the time spent with him, the scarab has gained a personality of its own and fully detached itself from the Reach hive-mind. Claiming Khaji Da (the combined utterance of Khaji, the codeword for Infiltrator and Da, its own serial number) as its name, the scarab sides with Reyes against the Reach. As the battle continues the Reach Negotiator unleashes a doomsday device on Earth in retaliation for his defeat. Jaime and the scarab agree to sacrifice themselves to stop the superweapon. At the last moment, Booster Gold appears and saves them both. The bond with the scarab stronger than ever, Jaime wonders if other scarabs will gain a personality due to Khaji Da talking to them about individuality.

Teen Titans
Jaime first teams up with the Titans in Teen Titans vol. 3 #50 and Blue Beetle vol. 7 #18, fighting Lobo, along with the group to ensure the launch of a satellite armed with anti-Reach technology. The Reach themselves apparently hire Lobo to keep their facade as benevolent protectors; at the last moment, Batman and the Teen Titans believe Jaime. Although criticizing Jaime for his lack of formal training, the Titans extend an invitation to visit and perhaps join the team. The Reach later attempt to remove Jaime from the equation, combining the missing A.I. of Jaime's scarab, a new scarab and a Sinestro Corps power ring into the Peacemaker, forcing him to cut the scarab from his spine to ensure that his scarab could not be used as a weapon again.

Jaime comes face to face with the Spectre, along with Luis, the man who had been responsible for crippling Jaime's father. After a visit from his quasi-girlfriend Traci Thirteen (former), Jaime realizes that he cannot stop the Spectre from executing the inmates. Jaime is forced to forgive Luis and reason with the Spectre. Partially successful, the Spectre warns Jaime that if he ever lets the scarab kill, the Spectre will come for him.

During the "Titans of Tomorrow, Today!" arc, Jaime takes the Titans up on their offer to visit, only to find that an alternate future version of the Titans have attacked the Tower and managed to kidnap key members of the Justice League. He later proves instrumental in the younger Titans' victory against their future selves and proves himself to be a competent hero by incapacitating the Future Flash and freeing the Justice League. He also aids the Titans in defeating Starro. During the conflict with the future Titans, Jaime is actively attacked by the adult version of Kid Devil, Red Devil, who claims that Jaime cannot be trusted. On the other hand, Lex Luthor describes Blue Beetle as an "unremitting nuisance" who holds on to his view of right and wrong no matter how much the world changes around him.

Jaime is recruited by Black Beetle (who originally identifies himself as a Blue Beetle from the future) and Garrett to go into the past with Booster Gold to prevent Kord's death. After saving Kord, Jaime and Garrett return, the future is revealed to be a dystopia ruled by Maxwell Lord, who now was never exposed and defeated. Black Beetle is also revealed to be a future enemy of Jaime's, who tries to create this future so he will never have to deal with Jaime and so he "would not lose her". In Booster Gold vol. 2 #10, seeing the damage done by their actions, Ted decides to accept his death and returns to the past, seemingly to the exact moment where he was murdered by Lord, returning the timeline to equilibrium and thus preventing the dystopia. However, in the epilogue for Booster Gold vol. 2 #1.000.000, a figure with a scarab enters a Kord Industries building that contains a Bug and a picture of Kord's enemy Overthrow among other things. His trademark laugh hints that it is actually Ted, who somehow escaped death but managed to fix the timestream.

The villain Shockwave revealed during his battle with Jaime that Kord Industries is now owned by the 100. He again came into conflict with Kid Devil, who still harbored a grudge against him because of both the future Titans incident and his status with Ravager. Jaime tries to mend fences with Kid Devil, but their squabbling allows Shockwave to escape. During their second battle with him, Kid Devil managed to tap into his demonic powers and partially melts Shockwave's armor, enabling the two boys to defeat him. This seems to squelch the ill feelings between them. Kid Devil asks Jaime if he's heard from Ravager and Jaime replies that he's faced down an entire alien race, but Ravager scares him. Kid Devil finally realizes that Jaime is being sincere and they shake hands and tell each other their real names. Later at Titans Tower Robin offers Jaime full-membership, which Jaime finally feels ready to accept.

In the aftermath of the massive Final Crisis crossover event, Kid Eternity, Static and Aquagirl join the team after their rescue from the Dark Side Club. Aquagirl begins hitting on Jaime despite knowing of his relationship with Traci, often speaking to him in Spanish to hide her intentions from the team. Despite feeling attracted, he chooses to remain loyal to Traci.

After Wonder Girl is kidnapped by the Fearsome Five, Beetle reluctantly allows Traci to assist the team in rescuing her. In the aftermath, Red Devil is killed saving the city.

When Beast Boy arrives at Titans Tower to lead the team, Jaime distrusts him and accuses him of caring more about winning Raven's love than helping the team.

Series finale
A group of Reach infiltrators and a negotiator invade Jaime's school's dance. Having been inspired by the scarab to rebel, the "Kahji Dha Revolutionary Army", sets out to make Earth safe by destroying those that could pose any threat. They see Jaime as a threat and attack. During the fight, Nadia, part of Jaime's tech support, is killed. Taking the fight into orbit, Jaime has the scarab hack into and deactivate the KDRA, but deactivating itself for 27 days in the process. The negotiator quickly recovers and Jaime is forced to take him on a kamikaze dive to the Earth's surface. The impact kills the negotiator and badly hurts Jaime, although the scarab put up a shield that protected him from the brunt of the impact. Over a period of weeks, Jaime and the scarab slowly recover. The scarab of the negotiator had, unbeknownst to Jaime, been recovered by Hector, Jaime's other tech support, who, as he left the country, used the negotiator's name "Djo Zha" which a stewardess confuses with "Joshua", indicating that he had bonded with it.

Further adventures
Starting in Booster Gold vol. 2 #21, Blue Beetle was featured as a 10-page ongoing co-feature. The stories focused on a smaller cast than before, focusing on Jaime, Paco and Brenda while Jaime's family occasionally appears. The rebooted scarab is shown to be more bloodthirsty than in the past, constantly urging Jaime to use more lethal weaponry. In the first serial, Jaime faces the android daughter of an old supervillain.

The Black Beetle attacks during a family hike. During the battle, Black Beetle claims to be Hector's future incarnation, wanting revenge for Nadia's death. He retracts his statement, claiming to have killed Hector and taken his scarab. When Milagro was injured by Black Beetle, Jaime loses his temper, finally giving in to the scarab's suggestions to use lethal force. Jaime eventually manages to use tachyon beams to paralyze Black Beetle, only for the villain to claim that he was Jaime from the future and that he would don the black scarab after Milagro (who would suffer brain damage from the injury she had just received in the present) destroyed the scarab. Jaime, deciding to get Milagro medical attention as quickly as possible, was forced to let Black Beetle escape. Before he departed, Black Beetle tells Jaime: "When you see Ted Kord, tell him I said "drop dead"". When Jaime states that Ted was already dead, Black Beetle replies "Yeah. I know". A few days later, Milagro is shown recovering in the hospital and Jaime is left deeply disturbed by his encounter.

Blue Beetle also teams with egotistical superhero Hardware to bring down a group of criminals using tech stolen from the late Edwin Alva by the second Gizmo. Despite finding Hardware extremely difficult to work with, the two take down the criminals and depart on friendly terms.

Not much later, he is visited by Skeets, Booster Gold's robotic partner, who warned him of his disappearance. Deciding to team up with the small machine to find Booster to pay respect to him for introducing him to the superhero world, he reaches the house of Rose Levin and Daniel Carter, Booster's 21st century ancestors. Soon after he arrives, the Black Lantern Ted Kord crashes his ship into Daniel's house and Jaime proceeds to battle Kord. Although outmatched and insulted by the Black Lantern, Jaime continues to fight until Booster enters the scene.

Later, both team up to destroy the Black Lantern, succeeding by blasting him with a special light gun designed by Ted Kord and separating him from the ring. Then, they move the remains into the Time Sphere and take the lifeless corpse to Vanishing Point Fortress, in the last second of the universe. There, Jaime promises to eventually live up to the legacy of the Blue Beetle and reestablish the Blue & Gold Team.

Justice League: Generation Lost
Following Blackest Night, Jaime and the other Titans travel to the city of Dakota to rescue Static after he is kidnapped by a metahuman gangster named Holocaust. Jaime uses the scarab to help locate Static, but he and his teammates are easily defeated during a battle by Holocaust, who is able to block a blast from Jaime's cannon and then strike him with a fireball. The Titans are ultimately rescued when Cyborg arrives with Kid Flash and Superboy.

During the start of the Brightest Day event, Deadman has a vision of Jaime shaking hands with Maxwell Lord, who is holding a gun behind his back. Shaken by his near-death in Dakota, Jaime informs Static that he plans to briefly leave to visit his family, fearing what would happen if he were to die without saying goodbye. Shortly after arriving home, Jaime and his family are attacked by a squad of OMACs. With help from Booster Gold, Ice and Captain Atom, Jaime is able to repel the OMACs, but is accidentally sucked into a teleportation rift they create. The heroes end up in Russia, where Jaime learns of Max Lord and his attempt to make the world forget he ever existed. He agrees to help the former Justice League members bring Lord to justice. After a battle with members of the Rocket Red Brigade, the heroes learn that Max Lord has been manipulating the team in hopes that they would reform Justice League International, with Jaime taking the role held years earlier by Ted Kord.

Before they can figure out their next move, the base is attacked by the Creature Commandos. During the battle Max reveals himself while posing as one of the Creature Commandos. Blue Beetle ends up unconscious and Max captures him, heading to the teleporter and leaving the JLI behind. When Blue Beetle is in captivity, Max injects him with an unknown substance. Tortured, he remembers Max's existence as the man who killed Ted Kord and destroyed his legacy. Jaime eventually manages to send a signal to the rest of the JLI to lead them to Max's headquarters. He breaks out of the laboratory and attacks Max, who, having discovered the weaknesses of the Blue Scarab, zaps Jaime with a special beam and, just as the JLI arrives, shoots him in the head with a blaster, apparently killing him in the same manner as his predecessor.

Max escapes from the JLI using an escape pod. Failing to capture Max, the JLI carried Jaime on the land surface where paramedics Rocket Red and Skeets try to resuscitate him. Their efforts fail as Jaime had already died. As the team deals with his loss, suddenly he sits up, healed, declaring he knows Max's ultimate plans and that they can stop him. Jaime reveals to them that his healing scarab armor is what protected him from the blaster. When the battle against the OMAC Prime goes nowhere, Blue Beetle attacks and OMAC Prime appears to take his power, but Blue Beetle mentions that it cannot take control with the Scarab's power. Blue Beetle attacks and blasts OMAC Prime.

The New 52
A new Blue Beetle title launched in fall 2011 after the conclusion of the Flashpoint event. It was written by Tony Bedard and drawn by Ig Guara and cancelled in February 2013.

Reyes and his friend Paco are driving to a party when a fight over a backpack between some men and the Brotherhood of Evil members Phobia, Plasmus and Warp erupts from a nearby building. To protect Paco, Jaime grabs the backpack. When La Dama's agents Brutale, Bone-Crusher and a new villain called Coyote join the fight, Brutale throws a knife at the backpack. The scarab inside is set off and Jaime is transformed into Blue Beetle.

In Green Lantern: New Guardians, other representatives of the Reach attack Odym, homeworld of the Blue Lantern Corps, where it is revealed that their armours have taken control of them; Jaime speculates, during a confrontation with Kyle Rayner, that his armour is damaged, explaining why he is in control of himself where other Reach soldiers are enslaved to their armour.

After being captured by Lady Styx's henchmen in Blue Beetle vol. 8 #16, Jaimie is forced to take part in the bounty hunter game The Haunted on the planet called Tolerance. After losing control over the Scarab armor and regaining control back, he teams up with a New God named Lonar, to kill the creator of the game Adonis and escape the planet. Lonar kills Adonis, takes his pocket dimension, and disappears. In Threshold #8 the producer of the show The Hunted, reveals that the show has been cancelled and sends Jaimie back to Earth.

In Futures End #0 Blue Beetle is seen working together with the resistance against Brother Eye and all the other dead superheroes. He dies and mutates into a robot controlled by Brother Eye.

DC Rebirth
In the latest relaunch of the DC Universe, DC Rebirth, Jaime is working with Ted Kord to study the beetle attached to Jaime's back and remove it. Once again, the beetle's origin is retconned, as revealed by Doctor Fate, who tells Kord that the beetle is not alien, but magical, similar to the original continuity pre-Infinite Crisis.

Graduation Day 
In the Blue Beetle: Graduation Day miniseries, Jamie is still continuing his superhero duties as Blue Beetle while also finally graduating from High School. However, during the ceremony, he gets a transmission from the scarab indicating that the Reach are planning something. Afterwards, following a party to celebrate Jaime graduating, Superman and Jaime share a heart to heart about Jamie's unsureness for his future and what he wants for himself. Superman then informs Jaime that, until they get a better understanding of the Reach broadcast, Jamie is "grounded" from being Blue Beetle and should spend time with his family. Jaime then find out from his parents that, because he's not attending college, he'll be heading to Palmera City to work at the family diner for the summer. Then, Paco shows everyone video of a mysterious Yellow Beetle arriving in Sensuntepeque, El Savador.

Powers and abilities
The Blue Beetle scarab is grafted onto Jaime Reyes's spine and can manifest a number of powers of its own volition, an act usually accompanied by blue energy emitted by the scarab's "antennae." Over the course of the first year of his ongoing series, Jaime had little, if any, control over those powers, but slowly asserts himself. When Jaime is in danger, the scarab activates, crawling out on to Jaime's back and generating a high-tech suit of powered armor around his body. The armor is resilient enough that it can protect him against re-entry from Earth's orbit. When the danger passes, the scarab deactivates, dissolving the costume and retracting back onto Jaime's spine, causing intense pain.

When in use, the suit can reconfigure itself to produce a wide array of armaments. Common functions include an energy cannon, a sword and shield, a grappling hook, a device resembling a communications satellite, and a set of foot-long powered blades that can shear through tree trunks. In addition, the suit can produce a set of wings for flight that can also act as shields. Jaime alludes to weapons that may be powerful enough to harm even the Spectre, one of DC's most powerful characters, claiming that some of the weapons are of mass-destruction caliber, but refuses to use lethal force. The suit can adapt to different situations, including producing energy discharges from the hands that can neutralize magic, discharging Kryptonite radiation and tuning "vibrational frequencies" of extra-dimensional objects to make them visible. The suit can create armaments of different composition and style. The wings, for example, were initially composed of the same blue opaque armor as the rest of the suit, but beginning with Blue Beetle vol. 7 #12 (April 2007), began manifesting themselves in the form of a colorless, translucent material.

The scarab has at least one power it can manifest whether dormant or active; it can give Jaime a peculiar form of "sight" to perceive extra-dimensional objects, which gather information on the scarab user's adversaries. The scarab is able to communicate with him in a more comprehensible fashion if need be. The scarab's language slowly morphs into a format resembling English, claiming Khaji Da as its own name and Jaime as its first real friend. However, it has occasional language relapses. The suit is capable of compensating for Jaime's digestive system, so that he does not need to expel waste materials when using the suit, and can even make paper out of dead skin cells the suit collects.

The scarab exhibits a reluctance to harm nature, as evidenced in Blue Beetle vol. 7 #4, in which Jaime is attacked by a pair of anthropomorphized trees, and the suit declines to use great force against them, until Jaime convinces the scarab that his life is in danger and wrests control over the suit to destroy the trees, much to the scarab's displeasure.

When necessary, Jaime can have the Scarab take over in Infiltrator Mode. When this happens, the suit becomes taller, more muscular and grows spikes and allows the scarab to fight without Jaime's conscience as a restriction. This lets it fight more brutally, but Jaime and the scarab do not like this and only resort to it in desperate situations.

Other versions
 An alternate version of Jaime appears in Justice Society of America vol. 3 #37-38 as part of the "Fatherland" storyline. Set twenty years in the future, Jaime has lost his powers after Captain Nazi and his fellow white supremacist villains activate their Great Darkness Engine, a device which neutralizes most of the world's metahumans and allows a Neo-Nazi regime known as the Fourth Reich to take over America. Held prisoner alongside the world's few surviving superheroes, Jaime is ultimately killed by security guards after attacking Mr. Terrific as a distraction for the other heroes to further their escape plans during the execution ceremony for Batman and the Joker.
 In the alternate future called of the book Titans Tomorrow, Red Devil killed this timeline's Blue Beetle.
 In the alternate timeline of the 2011 Flashpoint storyline, Jaime was a part of a team called the Ambush Bugs led by the Canterbury Cricket. They did an attack on the Amazons which ended in failure with the demise of every bug hero except the Canterbury Cricket.

Collected editions
The Blue Beetle series has been collected into a number of trade paperbacks:
{| class="wikitable" style="width:100%;"
|-
! Vol. #
! Title
! Collected material
! Pages
! Year
! ISBN
|-
|1
| Shellshocked
|Blue Beetle vol. 7, #1–6
| rowspan="2" |144
| 2006
|
|-
|2
| Road Trip
|Blue Beetle vol. 7, #7–12
| 2007
|
|-
|3
| Reach for the Stars
|Blue Beetle vol. 7, #13–19
|168
| 2008
|
|-
|4
| End Game
|Blue Beetle vol. 7, #20–26
|176
| 2008
|
|-
|5
| Boundaries
|Blue Beetle vol. 7, #29–34
|144
|
|
|-
|6
| Black and Blue|Blue Beetle vol. 7, #27–28, #35–36Booster Gold vol. 2, #21–25, #28–29
|168
|
|
|-
! colspan="6" |The New 52
|-
|1
|Metamorphosis
|Blue Beetle vol. 8, #1–6
|144
|
|
|-
|2
|Blue Diamond
|Blue Beetle vol. 8, #0, 7–16Green Lantern: New Guardians #9
|240
|
|
|-
! colspan="6" |DC Rebirth
|-
|1
|The More Things Change
|Blue Beetle: Rebirth #1Blue Beetle vol. 9 #1–5
|144
|
|
|-
|2
|Hard Choices
|Blue Beetle vol. 9 #6–12
|168
|
|
|-
|3
|Road to Nowhere
|Blue Beetle vol. 9 #13–18
|144
|
|
|-
|}

In other media
 Television 

 Jaime Reyes / Blue Beetle appears in the Smallville episode "Booster", portrayed by Jaren Brandt Bartlett. This version is a shy and clumsy teenager from Metropolis who was bullied until he bonded to the Blue Beetle scarab following a traffic accident near Kord Industries. Seeking to find the scarab, Ted Kord hires Booster Gold to help him, leading to him fighting Reyes before ultimately convincing him to stand up for himself. Kord offers to remove the scarab, but Reyes chooses to keep it and become a hero with his and Booster's help.
 Jaime Reyes / Blue Beetle appears in Batman: The Brave and the Bold, voiced by Will Friedle. This version is a fan of Batman and best friends with Paco Testas. In his most notable appearance, "Revenge of the Reach!", Reyes falls under the Reach's control and is forced to attack the Green Lantern Corps, but eventually regains control and frees the rest of the Reach's thralls via the Green Lanterns' energy.
 Additionally, an evil alternate universe incarnation of Reyes called the Scarlet Scarab (also voiced by Friedle) appears in the episode "Deep Cover for Batman!" as a member of the Injustice Syndicate.
 Jaime Reyes / Blue Beetle appears in Young Justice, voiced by Eric Lopez. This version is initially a member of the Team who became attached to the Blue Beetle scarab while passing by Kord Industries after Ted Kord sacrificed himself to stop the Light from obtaining the device. Additionally, Reyes does not experience pain while transforming into the Blue Beetle. Moreover, the Scarab (also voiced by Lopez) can speak in English, finds lethal courses of action preferable to capture and restraint, and was severed from the Reach's control after it landed on Earth centuries prior and came into contact with ancient Bialyan mystics. After being misled by the Reach's Green Martian thrall, B'arzz O'oomm / Green Beetle, Reyes and the Scarab fall under the Reach's control until the Team use the ancient mystics' magic to free them along with Green Beetle. Reyes would go on to help thwart the Reach's invasion of Earth and, in the third season, join Beast Boy's Outsiders and enter a relationship with Traci Thurston.
 Jaime Reyes / Blue Beetle appears in Justice League Action, voiced by Jake T. Austin.

Film
 Jaime Reyes / Blue Beetle appears in films set in DC Animated Movie Universe (DCAMU), voiced again by Jake T. Austin. This version is a member of the Teen Titans.
 He first appears in Justice League vs. Teen Titans.
 In Teen Titans: The Judas Contract, his troubled family life is explored as he takes up work in a soup kitchen and eventually reconciles with his family.
 Reyes makes a non-speaking appearance in a flashback in Justice League Dark: Apokolips War. He joined the Titans in defending Earth from Darkseid's forces, only to be killed by Darkseid's Paradooms.
 A Blue Beetle film centered around Jaime Reyes is in production, with Xolo Maridueña in the tile role. Angel Manuel Soto will serve as director, with a script written by Gareth Dunnet-Alcocer. Additionally, Bruna Marquezine and Belissa Escobedo were respectively cast as Reyes' love interest Penny and younger sister Milagros while Harvey Guillén was cast in an undisclosed role. Initially developed as an HBO Max exclusive film, it was later changed to a theatrical release, scheduled for August 18, 2023.

Video games
 Jaime Reyes / Blue Beetle appears as a playable character in Batman: The Brave and the Bold – The Videogame, voiced again by Will Friedle.
 Jaime Reyes / Blue Beetle appears as a DLC character in Young Justice: Legacy, voiced again by Eric Lopez.
 Jaime Reyes / Blue Beetle appears as a playable character in Infinite Crisis, voiced again by Eric Lopez.
 Jaime Reyes / Blue Beetle appears as a character summon in Scribblenauts Unmasked: A DC Comics Adventure.
 Jaime Reyes / Blue Beetle appears as a playable character in Lego Batman 3: Beyond Gotham, voiced by Dee Bradley Baker.
 Jaime Reyes / Blue Beetle appears as a playable character in Injustice 2, voiced by Antony Del Rio. This version is a member of Batman's Insurgency. In his non-canonical arcade mode ending, after defeating Brainiac, Reyes retires from superheroics to live with his family, who he has not seen ever since he bonded with the Scarab.
 Jaime Reyes / Blue Beetle appears as a playable character in Lego DC Super-Villains.

Miscellaneous
 Jaime Reyes / Blue Beetle appears in a screen test used to trial the concept of a Blue Beetle television series.
 Jaime Reyes appears in DC Universe Online: Legends as one of several metahumans gathered by Lex Luthor.
 Jaime Reyes appears in Smallville: Titans as a member of Jay Garrick's Teen Titans.
 Jaime Reyes / Blue Beetle appears in the Injustice 2 prequel comic as a protege of Ted Kord.
 Jaime Reyes / Blue Beetle makes background appearances in DC Super Hero Girls'' as a student of Super Hero High.

See also
 List of Blue Beetle enemies

References

External links
DC Comics.com: Blue Beetle (Jaime Reyes)
DC Database Project: Blue Beetle (Jaime Reyes)

Fictional characters from Chicago
Characters created by Keith Giffen
Characters created by John Rogers
Comics characters introduced in 2006
DC Comics characters who are shapeshifters
DC Comics characters with accelerated healing
DC Comics characters with superhuman strength
DC Comics characters who have mental powers
Fictional characters from Texas
Fictional technopaths
Fictional characters with anti-magic or power negation abilities
Fictional characters who can manipulate sound
Fictional characters with fire or heat abilities
Fictional characters with energy-manipulation abilities
Fighting game characters
Mexican superheroes
Teenage superheroes
Blue Beetle